Arvind Krishna is an Indian cinematographer, producer and actor in Indian film and television industry. He is well known for his work in 7G Rainbow Colony (2004) and Pudhupettai (2006).

Early life
Born in New Delhi on 11 May, Arvind Krishna spent his childhood traversing between Chennai and Delhi. He was educated at the Vidya Mandir Senior Secondary School, Mylapore, and holds a professional graduate degree in Visual Communication from Loyola College, Chennai. His father, a producer, was one of the first to produce a TV series for Doordarshan called "Adade Manohar". S.Krishnan ( Arvind's father) owned a film lab called "Aarkay Home Movies" and a production company called "Ark Media". Arvind was inspired by his father and thus chose to pursue a career in film and television.

Marriage
He is married to Anupama Arvind.

Career

Cinematography
His first stint was with P.C.Sreeram, with whom he interned for six years. In this role he assisted him in the cinematography department and worked on several prestigious ad campaigns, television commercials and feature films. He then moved to work independently as a cinematographer. Subsequently, he met film director Selvaraghavan and was his chief camera person for "Kadhal Kondein, 7G Rainbow Colony and Pudhupettai".
Gautham Vasudev Menon noted producer and director collaborated with Arvind Krishna on "Pachaikili Muthucharam". Arvind has also worked with Veteran P.Vasu for the film "Kuselan". A.L.Vijay and Arvind worked together on "Poi Solla Porom" (a remake of "Khosla Ka Ghosla"). Some of the creative influences for Arvind's work as a cinematographer are the works of Vilmos Zsigmond Janusz Kamiński and Ashok Mehta.

Production
In 2012, he re-launched "Ark Media" and produced for Star Vijay a TV series called "Dharmayutham", an acclaimed first-of-its-kind legal drama. 
For this production he was the Creative Head cum Producer. The serial has been directed by A.L. Abanindran. It stars Raja Krishnamoorthy, Abbas, Evam's Karthik Kumar, and Anuja Iyer. The first season has just been completed and the second is likely to kick off soon. This production was telecasted for 5 months, spanning 104 episodes.
Ark Media is currently in the pre-production phase for a few more TV series in varied genres.

Acting
Arvind Krishna has dabbled in acting and was featured in Padmashri Kamal Hassan's police story "Kurudhipunal " in a much-appreciated role as Dhanush. He also starred in Rajeev Menon's "Kandukonden Kandukonden" as protagonist's best friend. In addition he did a cameo appearance in "Poi Solla Poram" and "Theeratha Vilayatu Pillai".

Filmography

Films

References

 "We are creative gamblers". Chennai, India: The Hindu. 2006-02-14. http://www.hindu.com/thehindu/mp/2006/02/14/stories/2006021400090100.htm. Retrieved 2009-04-16.
 "Dhanush under White Elephants". Oneindia. http://entertainment.oneindia.in/tamil/top-stories/dhanush-white-elephants-240107.html. Retrieved 2009-04-16.
 "Aravind Krishna and Selvaraghavan part ways!". cinesouth.com. http://www.cinesouth.com/masala/hotnews/new/31082007-2.shtml. Retrieved 2009-04-16.
 "'Dharmayutham' on Vijay TV promises to be a refreshing change". Chennai Online. http://chennaionline.com/movies/preview/20122606112637/Dharmayutham-on-Vijay-TV-promises-to-be-a-refreshing-change.col. Retrieved 27 November 2012.
 "Abbas, Karthik enters serial with Dharmayudham on Vijay Tv". 88 DB Reviews. https://web.archive.org/web/20121108061002/http://reviews.in.88db.com/index.php/movie/movie-news/17899-abbas-karthik-enters-serial-with-dharmayudham-on-vijay-tv. Retrieved 27 November 2012.

External links

Living people
Year of birth missing (living people)
People from Delhi
Tamil film cinematographers
Indian television producers